Built to Spill, an American rock band, have released nine studio albums, one live album, one compilation album, five extended plays (EPs), twenty-three singles, and ten music videos. Their recording material was distributed mainly by Warner Bros. Records. They have also released material under ATP Recordings, C/Z Records, Up Records, K Records, City Slang, and Ernest Jenning Record Co.

Albums

Studio albums

Live albums

Compilation albums

Cover albums

Extended plays

Singles

Guest appearances

Videography

Music videos

References

External links
Built to Spill's official website

Built to Spill
Built to Spill
Alternative rock discographies